Alan Marcus Prichard (15 November 1907 – 2 November 1986) was a pilot for the New Zealand Public Works Department from the late 1930s to mid-1950s.  Using a Miles Whitney Straight from 1939 on his own initiative and sometimes forging aircraft log books to conceal his work, Prichard conducted trials of aerial seed sowing and spreading fertilizer which ultimately led to the development of aerial topdressing.

References

Alexander, G. & J. S. Tullett, The Super Men. A. H. & A. W. Reed, Wellington, 1967 (a popular, anecdotal history of the early years of top dressing)
D. A. Campbell, Some observations on Top dressing in New Zealand, New Zealand Journal of Science and Technology Volume X 1948 (the article which started the industry).
Ewing, Ross and MacPherson, Ross The History of New Zealand Aviation, Heinemann, 1986
Geelen, Janic, The Topdressers NZ Aviation Press. Te Awamutu, 1983 (a more comprehensive history of New Zealand top dressing, mostly regional, with separate chapters about matters such as aircraft development).

External links
Encyclopedia history of Topdressing to the mid-1960s
New Zealand topdressing history

1907 births
1986 deaths
New Zealand aviators
New Zealand public servants